The 1999 Newfoundland general election was held on February 9, 1999 to elect members of the 44th General Assembly of Newfoundland. It was won by the Liberal party.

Results

* Party did not nominate candidates in previous election.

Results by district

St. John's

|-
|bgcolor=whitesmoke|23. Kilbride
|
|HOWLETT, Barbara      2133
||
|BYRNE, Ed      4145
|
|INGRAM, Lee      289
|
|STUCKLESS, Vicki     119
||
|Ed Byrne

|-
|bgcolor=whitesmoke|33. St. John's Centre
||
|AYLWARD, Joan   2609
|
|BROWN, Paul      2443
|
|LONG, Valerie     1120
|
|
||
|Joan Aylward
|-
|bgcolor=whitesmoke|34. St. John's East
|
|McGRATH, Tom      1559
||
|OTTENHEIMER, John     3774
|
|DARBY, Barry      600
|
|
||
|Hubert Kitchen
|-
|bgcolor=whitesmoke|35. St. John's North
||
|MATTHEWS, Lloyd     2304
|
|ANDREWS, Ray      1971
|
|KIRBY, Dale      788
|
|
||
|Lloyd Matthews
|-
|bgcolor=whitesmoke|36. St. John's South
|
|KENNEDY, Patrick      1563
||
|OSBORNE, Tom      4041
|
|VANTA, Judy     374
|
|CRUMMEY, Jason      101
||
|Tom Osborne
|-
|bgcolor=whitesmoke|37. St. John's West
|
|MOORE, Tom      2532
||
|OSBORNE, Sheila     3206
|
|LYNCH, Pat      683
|
|
||
||Sheila Osborne
|-
|bgcolor=whitesmoke|38. Signal Hill - Quidi Vidi
|
|SOUCY, Pete      2010
|
|O'BRIEN, Chris      793
||
|HARRIS, Jack      2179
|
|HILLIER, Paul David      116   DUNN, Shaun      53
||
|Jack Harris

|-
|bgcolor=whitesmoke|46. Virginia Waters
||
|NOEL, Walter      2973
|
|WALSH, Paul      2277
|
|WILL, Amanda     887
|
|STAPLETON, Deanne    131
||
|Walter Noel
|}

St. John's suburbs

|-
|bgcolor=whitesmoke|8. Cape St. Francis
|
|MARTIN, Jim    2169
||
|BYRNE, Jack    4197
|
|SULLIVAN, Shawn   440
|
|
||
|Jack Byrne
|-
|bgcolor=whitesmoke|11. Conception Bay East & Bell Island
||
|WALSH, Jim     2426
|
|COLE, Doug      1803
|
|KAVANAGH, Ken      932
|
|KELLAND-DYER, Sue
(NL Party)   876
||
|Jim Walsh
|-
|bgcolor=whitesmoke|12. Conception Bay South
|
|LEE, Bill      1806
||
|FRENCH, Bob      3888
|
|PORTER, Reg     330
|
|
||
|Bob French

|-
|bgcolor=whitesmoke|27. Mount Pearl
||
|BETTNEY, Julie      3468
|
| SHEEHAN, Cathy     2269
|
|GROUCHEY, Glen C.     489
|
|
||
|Julie Bettney
|-
|bgcolor=whitesmoke|41. Topsail
||
|WISEMAN, Ralph     3381
|
|FIFIELD, Rick      2533
|
|SNOW, Mary      568
|
|
||
|Pat Cowan

|-
|bgcolor=whitesmoke|47. Waterford Valley
|
|BUCKLE, Paula M.      2680
||
|HODDER, Harvey      3480
|
|MADDIGAN, Bill     239
|
|
||
|Harvey Hodder
|}

Avalon and Burin peninsulas

|-
|bgcolor=whitesmoke|3. Bellevue
||
|BARRETT, Percy   3229
|
|COOMBS, Gus   1667
|
|INGRAM, Mose   375
|
|
||
|Percy Barrett
|-
|bgcolor=whitesmoke|7. Burin - Placentia West
||
|HODDER, Mary    3469
|
|LUNDRIGAN, Dominic  2658
|
|BUTLER, Wayne   382
|
|
||
|Mary Hodder

|-
|bgcolor=whitesmoke|9. Carbonear - Harbour Grace
||
|SWEENEY, George   4132
|
|GARLAND, Claude    2266
|
|NOEL, Kevin    391
|
|
||
|Art Reid

|-
|bgcolor=whitesmoke|14. Ferryland
|
|MULLOWNEY, Harold      2141
||
|SULLIVAN, Loyola     4482
|
|RYAN, Gerry      147
|
|
||
|Loyola Sullivan

|-
|bgcolor=whitesmoke|17. Grand Bank
||
|FOOTE, Judy      3964
|
|BOLT, John      1146
|
|RENNIE, Richard     538
|
|
||
|Judy Foote
|-
|bgcolor=whitesmoke|19. Harbour Main - Whitbourne
|
|DAWE, Wanda      2502
||
|HEDDERSON, Tom     3670
|
|AKERMAN, Fred      511
|
|
||
|Don Whelan
|-
|bgcolor=whitesmoke|28. Placentia & St. Mary's
|
|SPARROW, Anthony   2938
||
|MANNING, Fabian   3579
|
|
|
|
||
|Anthony Sparrow

|-
|bgcolor=whitesmoke|30. Port De Grave
||
|EFFORD, John   4488
|
|COOPER, Paul      1026
|
|QUIGLY, Steve     185
|
|
||
|John Efford

|-
|bgcolor=whitesmoke|43. Trinity - Bay De Verde
||
|SNOW, Lloyd     3201
|
|BURSEY, Peter      2176
|
|JACOBS, Jeff      320
|
|NEWHOOK, Monty   214
||
|Lloyd Snow
|}

Central Newfoundland

|-
|bgcolor=whitesmoke|1. Baie Verte
|
|BURTON, Gerald   1988
||
|SHELLEY, Paul   3152
|
|
|
|
||
|Paul Shelley

|-
|bgcolor=whitesmoke|4. Bonavista North
||
|TULK, Beaton   3943
|
|COOZE, Jim   1277
|
|
|
|
||
|Beaton Tulk
|-
|bgcolor=whitesmoke|5. Bonavista South
|
|CLEMENTS, George   1768
||
|FITZGERALD, Roger   4496
|
|CRANN, Shawn   80
|
|
||
|Roger Fitzgerald

|-
|bgcolor=whitesmoke|13. Exploits
||
|GRIMES, Roger   2526
|
|GILLINGHAM, Gonzo      1944
|
|
|
|BEST, Arnold      633
||
|Roger Grimes

|-
|bgcolor=whitesmoke|16. Gander
||
|KELLY, Sandra C.      3064
|
|O'BRIEN, Kevin     2926
|
|LOCKE, Roy      193
|
|
||
|Sandra Kelly

|-
|bgcolor=whitesmoke|18. Grand Falls - Buchans
||
|THISTLE, Anna      3511
|
|WOOLRIDGE, Lorne     2349
|
|BUCKINGHAM, Bob      188
|
|
||
|Anna Thistle

|-
|bgcolor=whitesmoke|26. Lewisporte
|
|PENNEY, Melvin      2116
||
|RIDEOUT, Tom     3791
|
|DWYER, Michael J.      125
|
|
||
|Melvin Penney

|-
|bgcolor=whitesmoke|39. Terra Nova
||
|LUSH, Tom      3514
|
|STEAD, Rob     1740
|
|
|
|
||
|Tom Lush

|-
|bgcolor=whitesmoke|44. Trinity North
||
|OLDFORD, Doug     2979
|
|KELLY-BLACKMORE, Sheila     2183
|
|CORBETT, Dan      714
|
|
||
|Doug Oldford
|-
|bgcolor=whitesmoke|45. Twillingate & Fogo
||
|REID, Gerry     3343
|
|McKENNA, Gerald      1466
|
|
|
|MITCHELL, Dallas      270
||
|Gerry Reid

|-
|bgcolor=whitesmoke|48. Windsor - Springdale
|
|FLIGHT, Graham      2180
||
|HUNTER, Ray      3192
|
|HOWE, Rose      115
|
|BENNETT, Roger B.      95   SMITH, Aubrey     263
||
|Graham Flight
|-

Western and Southern Newfoundland

|-
|bgcolor=whitesmoke|2. Bay of Islands
||
|JOYCE, Eddie   3164
|
|HUNT, Paul   1713
|
|HANN, Israel   620
|
|
||
|Brian Tobin
|-
|bgcolor=whitesmoke|6. Burgeo & La Poile
||
|PARSONS, Kelvin   3421
|
|SHEAVES, Greg   1988
|
|MARSDEN, Owen   342
|
|
||
|Bill Ramsay
|-
|bgcolor=whitesmoke|15. Fortune Bay - Cape La Hune
||
|LANGDON, Oliver     3189
|
|BAKER, Bob      1353
|
|
|
|
||
|Oliver Langdon

|-
|bgcolor=whitesmoke|20. Humber East
||
|MERCER, Bob      3197
|
|WELLS, Janice     2405
|
|MEHANEY, Jean      246
|
|LEDREW, David B.      259
||
|Bob Mercer
|-
|bgcolor=whitesmoke|21. Humber Valley
||
|WOODFORD, Rick     3051
|
|ROSE, Warren      1422
|
|
|
|
||
|Rick Woodford
|-
|bgcolor=whitesmoke|22. Humber West
||
|DICKS, Paul     2814
|
|CALLAHAN, Pat      1152
|
|BOURGEOIS, Paul      852
|
|
||
|Paul Dicks

|-
|bgcolor=whitesmoke|29. Port au Port
||
|SMITH, Gerald      2976
|
|MARCHE, Ada      1719
|
|WHALEN, Sharon     421
|
|SMALLWOOD, William      151
||
|Gerald Smith
|-
|bgcolor=whitesmoke|31. St. Barbe
||
|FUREY, Chuck      2878
|
|ROBERTS, Rod     1950
|
|
|
|
||
|Chuck Furey
|-
|bgcolor=whitesmoke|32. St. George's - Stephenville East
||
|AYLWARD, Kevin      2546
|
|MUISE, Leonard     1944
|
|
|
|JOHNSON, Dave      345
||
|Kevin Aylward

|-
|bgcolor=whitesmoke|40. The Straits & White Bay North
||
|TOBIN, Brian   3227
|
|MITCHELMORE, Ford      1089
|
|
|
|
||
|Chris Decker
|}

Labrador

|-
|bgcolor=whitesmoke|10. Cartwright - L'Anse Au Clair
||
|JONES, Yvonne    1832
|
|MOORES, Sharon   312
|
|
|
|
||
|Yvonne Jones
|-
|bgcolor=whitesmoke|24. Labrador West
|
|CANNING, Perry      2544
|
|WHITTEN, Susan     400
||
|COLLINS, Randy      2700
|
|
||
|Perry Canning
|-
|bgcolor=whitesmoke|25. Lake Melville
||
|McLEAN, Ernie  1915
|
|BROOMFIELD, Hayward      1413
|
|PEDDLE, Ronald W.     323
|
|
||
|Ernie McLean
|-
|bgcolor=whitesmoke|42. Torngat Mountains
||
|ANDERSEN, Wally      1036
|
|TSHAKAPESH, Simeon      182
|
|
|
|
||
|Wally Andersen
|}

See also
List of Newfoundland and Labrador General Assemblies
List of Newfoundland and Labrador political parties

External links
Government of Newfoundland and Labrador
Elections Newfoundland and Labrador
Election Report

Parties
Progressive Conservative Party of Newfoundland and Labrador (see also Progressive Conservative Party of Canada)
Liberal Party of Newfoundland and Labrador (see also Liberal Party of Canada)
Newfoundland and Labrador New Democratic Party (see also New Democratic Party)
Labrador Party

1999
1999 elections in Canada
1999 in Newfoundland and Labrador
February 1999 events in Canada